The 2013 Durango-Durango Emakumeen Saria was the twelfth running of the Durango-Durango Emakumeen Saria, a women's bicycle race in Spain. It was rated by the UCI as a 1.2 category race.

Results

s.t. = same time
Source

References

External links
 Official website 

2013 in Spanish road cycling
Durango-Durango Emakumeen Saria
June 2013 sports events in Europe